Peter Rasmussen (born 16 May 1967) is a Danish former association football player. He won the 1995 Danish Superliga with AaB and played 254 games and scored 68 goals in two stints with the club, interrupted by two seasons with VfB Stuttgart in the Fußball-Bundesliga. He ended his career with Viborg FF in 1998. He played 13 games for the Denmark national football team from 1989 to 1996, and scored two goals against Mexico and Argentina as Denmark won the 1995 FIFA Confederations Cup.

Honours 
 1994–95 Danish Superliga
 1995 FIFA Confederations Cup

References

External links 
 Danish national team profile 
 Danish Superliga statistics 
 
 Haslund profile 

1967 births
Living people
Danish men's footballers
Denmark international footballers
Denmark under-21 international footballers
Danish expatriate men's footballers
AaB Fodbold players
Aalborg Chang players
VfB Stuttgart players
Viborg FF players
1995 King Fahd Cup players
FIFA Confederations Cup-winning players
Danish Superliga players
Danish 1st Division players
Bundesliga players
Expatriate footballers in Germany
Association football forwards
People from Hobro
Sportspeople from the North Jutland Region